Quentin Othon (born 27 March 1988) is a French footballer who plays for French club Strasbourg II. He has represented his country at under-16, under-17, under-18, under-19 and under-21 levels.

Club career

Strasbourg
On 27 July 2007, Othon signed his first professional contract agreeing to a four-year deal with RC Strasbourg until June 2011. He started as left back for Strasbourg due to his ability to run and make crosses from the left wing.

Châteauroux (loan)
On 18 July 2010, Ligue 2 club Châteauroux announced that they had signed Othon from RC Strasbourg on a season-long loan deal, with the option to make the move permanent at the end of the season. During winter transfer window Othon went to loan on another Ligue 2 team for 5 months.

FC Nantes (loan)
On 6 January 2011, Ligue 2 club Nantes announced that they had signed Othon from RC Strasbourg on a season-long loan deal, with the option to make the move permanent at the end of the season. He made a total of 9 appearances for Nantes in League and played as defensive midfield role.

Troyes
On 26 August 2011, Ligue 1 club Troyes announced that they had signed Othon from RC Strasbourg on a long term deal for undisclosed fee. Othon scored his first goal for Troyes in 2013–14 season with stunning left foot shot from outside of the box.

International career
Othon is a French youth international and has represented his nation at the U16, U17, and U18 levels. Othon represented France U21 at the UEFA European Under-21 Championship Qualifiers.

External links
Quentin OTHON - Racing Club de Strasbourg - racingstub.com

1988 births
Living people
Association football midfielders
French footballers
French people of Martiniquais descent
RC Strasbourg Alsace players
LB Châteauroux players
FC Nantes players
ES Troyes AC players
France youth international footballers